Srirampura is a town and residential suburb of Mysore city in India. It is located in the Southern part of the city . It has a population of approximately 11,000 according to the 2011 Census. The main landmarks of this area are Brahmarahbha Choultrey, SBM park, Madhuvana Park. There are several schools in and around this area. North of Srirampura is Vivekananda Nagar and Kuvempunagar. West of Srirampura is Ramakrishnanagar, East of Srirampura is Asokapuram. South of Srirampura is the Mananthavady-Mysore Highway. In November 2020, a gazetted notification was passed upgrading the census town to a town panchayat. The notification combines towns and villages of Srirampura, Lingambudhipalya, Gurur, Koppalur and Kalalavadi villages coming under Srirampura GP, covering a total area of 17.99 km2. According to 2011 census, the town has a combined population of 18,511.

Lingambudhi Lake

On the south western side of SRirampura, there is a lake called the Lingambudhi Lake. The Lingambudhi Lake is now a dry place with water hardly visible except on rainy season. The embankment of the lake is popular with tourists and fitness freaks.  The lake is adjescent to posh residential colonies like Rabindranath Tagore Layout (R.T.Nagar).

Demographics 
The town has combined population of 18,511 according to 2011 census. Population breakdown is given below.

Suburbs of Srirampura
 Vivekananda Circle
 Mahadevapura
 SBM Colony
 Madhuvana Layout
 BEML Nagar
 Kandayanagara
 Surya layout

Bus Route from Mysore City
 K.G.Koppal - Apollo Hospitals - Akshya Bandar - Nrpathunga Road
 Karuna Hospital - Vivekanands Circle - IOB Srirampur
 Mother Teresa PU - Mahavir School - Vijaya Bank Srirampur - (Srirampur Last Bus stop)

Image gallery

See also
 Jayaprakash Nagar Mysore
 Mysore South

References

Mysore South
Suburbs of Mysore